Ashraf Uddin Ahmed Chunnu is a Bangladeshi former professional footballer who played for the Bangladesh national team for 10 years between 1975 and 1985. The left-winger represented Bangladesh in 50 international matches in which he scored 17 official goals during his 10-year long national career.

Career 
Chunnu started his football career with Dilkusha (first division) in 1973. He played for Abahani KC for a long period from 1975 to 1988 after playing for Rahmatganj Muslim Friends Society in 1974, besides wearing the national team jersey. The winger, locally known as Chunnu, scored a hat-trick as the first-ever Bangladeshi footballer against Nepal at the President's Gold Cup at the Bangabandhu National Stadium in 1983.

Chunnu was the first Bangladeshi goal scorer in a WC qualifier (against India). Later he scored the winner against Indonesia with a free kick just outside the penalty area. Bangladesh  won 2–1, their first ever victory, and their first ever point in WC qualifying matches in the FIFA World Cup Qualifier in 1985. He participated in the 1980 AFC Asian Cup, scoring the second goal in the history of Bangladesh in the Asian Cup in the 88th minute, against North Korea. Bangladesh was eliminated in the first round, with four defeats in that tournament. Later, Chunnu scored two goals in the 1986 World Cup qualifier without progressing from the first round. He is the first Bangladeshi player to score a goal in FIFA World Cup qualification round.

International goals
Scores and results list Bangladesh's goal tally first.

Awards & achievements 
In 1991 he contested in the Bangladesh general elections from Narayanganj-4 under the Awami League banner. Chunnu won the National Sports Award as a national footballer in 1996. In 2003, he served as the Abahani director and football secretary. In 2005, he was made the manager (team leader) of the Bangladesh national team. He also served as the joint secretary of Bangladesh Football Federation (BFF). He is the chairman of the football committee of Sheikh Jamal Dhanmondi Club.

See also
 List of top international men's football goal scorers by country

References

1956 births
Living people
Bangladesh Football Premier League players
Bangladeshi footballers
Bangladesh international footballers
Abahani Limited (Dhaka) players
Rahmatganj MFS players
Abahani Limited Dhaka managers
Asian Games competitors for Bangladesh
1980 AFC Asian Cup players
Association football forwards
South Asian Games medalists in football
South Asian Games silver medalists for Bangladesh
Recipients of the Bangladesh National Sports Award